The Presa Canario is a Spanish breed of large dog of mastiff or catch dog type. It originates in the autonomous region of the Canary Islands, and is found mostly in the islands of Gran Canaria and Tenerife. It was formerly known as the Dogo Canario. It was traditionally used as a guard dog, as a herding dog for both sheep and cattle, and for dog-fighting, which was legal in Spain until 1936 and may have continued clandestinely thereafter.

History 
The Presa Canario derives from the Bardino Majorero, which was formerly distributed throughout the Canary Islands. Dogs of this type were cross-bred with various dogs of molossoid type introduced to the islands at different times during the colonial period. The Presa Canario was particularly influenced by dogs brought from the British Isles with the large influx of British residents in the late nineteenth century.

By the 1960s it was close to extinction. A breed society, the Club Español del Presa Canario, was formed in 1982, and drew up a provisional breed standard, which was published by the government of the islands. The standard was approved by the Real Sociedad Canina de España in 1989. In 1991 the dog was included in an official list of national symbols of the Canary Islands as a symbol of the island of Gran Canaria. It was officially recognised by the Spanish national government in 2001.

The breed was provisionally accepted by the Federation Cynologique Internationale in 2001 under the name Dogo Canario; it was fully accepted in 2011. In December 2018, at the request of the Real Sociedad Canina de España, the name was changed to Presa Canario.

Importation and sale of the breed is prohibited in Australia and New Zealand.

Characteristics 

The Presa Canario is a large dog with a heavy muscular body. 

The head is broad, massive, square, and powerful brachycephalic shape. Proper head and good expression are part of the breed standard, and are manifest in the best breed specimens. The ears are normally cropped, both to create a more formidable expression and to prevent damage while working with cattle. If cropped, the ears stand erect. In countries where ear-cropping is banned, the ears are close fitting to the head; they hang down and should be pendant or "rose"-shaped. The upper lip is pendulous, although not excessively. Seen from the front, the upper and lower lips come together to form an inverted V. The flews are slightly divergent. The inside of the lips is a dark colour.

The breed is also characterized by a sloping topline (with the rear being slightly higher than the shoulders). Another characteristic of the breed is the shape of the paws (cat foot) and the catlike movement of the animal. The body is mesomorphic, that is, slightly longer than the dog is tall, contributing to the feline movement.

Use 
The Presa Canario was traditionally used as a guard dog, as a herding dog for both sheep and cattle, and for dog-fighting, which was legal in Spain until 1936 and may have continued clandestinely thereafter. Until the 1950s it remained a common practice in all of the islands.

Footnotes

Catch dogs
Dog breeds originating in the Canary Islands
Dog fighting breeds
FCI breeds
Mastiffs
Rare dog breeds